Wang Huayun (January 7, 1908 – February 18, 1992) was a People's Republic of China politician. He was born in Guantao County, Hebei. He was a graduate of Peking University. He was CPPCC Chairman of Henan. He was a delegate to the 1st National People's Congress, 2nd National People's Congress, 3rd National People's Congress, 4th National People's Congress, 5th National People's Congress and 6th National People's Congress.

1908 births
1992 deaths
People's Republic of China politicians from Hebei
Chinese Communist Party politicians from Hebei
National University of Peking alumni
CPPCC Chairmen of Henan
People from Guangtao County
Delegates to the 1st National People's Congress
Delegates to the 2nd National People's Congress
Delegates to the 3rd National People's Congress
Delegates to the 4th National People's Congress
Delegates to the 5th National People's Congress
Delegates to the 6th National People's Congress